Uncle Grandpa is an American animated television series created by Peter Browngardt for Cartoon Network. It ran from September 2, 2013 to June 30, 2017. It is based on Browngardt's animated short of the same name from the unaired Cartoonstitute. Uncle Grandpa is also a spin-off of Secret Mountain Fort Awesome, which was in turn a spin-off of the Cartoonstitute short. It was produced by Cartoon Network Studios.

The show is a surreal action-adventure comedy that relies extensively on visual gags and catchphrases. Creator Pete Browngardt has cited the work of cartoonists Don Martin, Gary Larson and Robert Crumb, as well as Golden Age–era animators such as Tex Avery and Max Fleischer when it came to developing the style of the show. Each 11-minute episode is presented in a unique format, consisting of a main seven to nine-minute story, some short bumpers typically composed of a quick visual joke, and an original short that focuses on the show's side characters.

Cartoon Network renewed the series for the fourth and fifth seasons: first splitting the second season (of 52 episodes) into two halves, which respectively became the second and third season, then also dividing in half the already announced third season into the fourth and fifth season (of 26 and 23 episodes, respectively), which served as the final seasons.

Plot
Uncle Grandpa, a magical shapeshifting humanoid, stops by children's houses every day to see how they are doing. The children he visits have a problem of their own and Uncle Grandpa tries to help them through a series of chaotic and surreal misadventures. He is a clowny sort of person who sometimes eats inedible objects (paper, and mostly books). He drives/lives in a UG-2000 model robotic RV known as the Perpetual Persistence and is accompanied by a talking red fanny pack named Belly Bag, a green dinosauroid named Mr. Gus, a static photographic cutout of a tiger named Giant Realistic Flying Tiger, and an anthropomorphic pepperoni pizza slice named Pizza Steve. He greets everybody using “Good Morning.”

Characters

Main

 Uncle Grandpa (voiced by Peter Browngardt, Pendleton Ward in "For Pete! Love, Pen"). Uncle Grandpa is a strong magical shapeshifting humanoid, sort of like a genie.
 Mr. Gus (voiced by Kevin Michael Richardson), usually the voice of reason.
 Pizza Steve (voiced by Adam DeVine, Pendleton Ward in "For Pete! Love, Pen") − Pizza Steve is an anthropomorphic pepperoni pizza slice with sunglasses and a member of Uncle Grandpa's crew.
 Giant Realistic Flying Tiger − A static photographic cutout of a tiger that Uncle Grandpa rides on to get around.
 Belly Bag (voiced by Eric Bauza) − Uncle Grandpa's talking red cyborg fanny pack and best friend.

Recurring
 Tiny Miracle the Robot Boy (voiced by Tom Kenny) – Uncle Grandpa's imaginary UG-series robotic telephone grandson.
 Beary Nice (voiced by Audie Harrison) and Hot Dog Person (voiced by Eric Bauza) – These two are the stars of their own recurring segment, "New Experiences".
 Charlie Burgers the Ball-Loving Dog Next Door (voiced by Brian Posehn) – A talking dog that befriends Uncle Grandpa and his friends.
 Santa Claus (voiced by Bob Joles) is the famous figure for Christmas and is revealed to be Uncle Grandpa's brother in the Christmas special. They have had a troubled relationship since 1983. 
 Frankenstein (voiced by Mark Hamill) – A tag-along with Uncle Grandpa in his adventures.
 Xarna, She-Warrior of the Apocalypse (voiced by Eric Bauza) − A cyborg. She is on a mission to get some gas for the Mad Motorcycle.
 Ule Gapa (voiced by Tom Kenny) is an unfriendly blue big mouthed alien with 4 sharp teeth who is constantly yelling at people. He appears first in an intermission when Uncle Grandpa tells Mr. Gus that his own logo is an imposter and destroys it using a magical spells, and he comes out saying “Hey! YOU’re NOT ULE GAPA, I’m ULE GAPA!”
 Evil Wizard (voiced by Rob Schrab) − A wizard who goes around trying to make everyone's day horrible by humiliating them but he actually makes their lives better.
 Priscilla Jones (voiced by Lena Headey) − Uncle Grandpa's nemesis with a British accent and the main antagonist of the series under the pseudonym “Aunt Grandma”. She wants revenge on him for ruining her science project and to usurp him as Aunt Grandma, her new colors.

Human children and adults
 Belly Kid (voiced by Zachary Gordon) – A kid who has a big belly. He was first ashamed of it, but Uncle Grandpa taught him the best features of having a big belly. He appeared in "Belly Bros".
 Caleb (voiced by Jonathan Adams) – A boy that Uncle Grandpa takes out of a math test to go battle Evil Wizard in outer space. He appeared in "Tiger Trails".
 Melvin (voiced by Jarid Root)  – Melvin is a bratty kid who likes to play Space Emperor, with him being the emperor. When Uncle Grandpa accidentally sent him into another dimension, he was sent to a planet where he's the emperor. He discovered what it's like being a servant, and learns his lesson after Emperor Krell bosses him around. He loves dinner sandwiches, and hates mayonnaise. He appeared in "Space Emperor". His catchphrase is "I decide who does what!"
 Melvin's Babysitter (voiced by Grey DeLisle-Griffin) – an attractive teenage girl with braces who babysits Melvin in the episode "Space Emperor".
 Eric (voiced by Eric Bauza) – Eric is a kid who doesn't have a nickname but Uncle Grandpa helps him. Uncle Grandpa helps him be legendary to get his nickname. In the process of becoming legendary he becomes tall and muscular. In the end he gets the nickname, "Cupcake", because he loves cupcakes. He appears in "Nickname".
 Mary (voiced by Pamela Adlon) – Mary is a nervous girl. She takes her driver's test, but fails. Uncle Grandpa takes her on a test and helps her pass. Uncle Grandpa gives her her own "Freedom and Independence USA" truck for passing her test. She appears in "Driver's Test".
 Dennis (voiced by Tom Kenny) – Dennis is a kid who wanted to finally pass his teacher's hard class and avoid going to summer school, until Uncle Grandpa comes and eats his homework and putting Dennis in danger of going to summer school. So Dennis and Uncle Grandpa go to Egypt to get a real pyramid to make sure Dennis gets an A+++++-+ on his project. Dennis appears in "Uncle Grandpa Ate My Homework!".
 Mrs. Numty (voiced by Grey DeLisle-Griffin) – Dennis' teacher. She appears in "Uncle Grandpa Ate My Homework!" and "1992 Called"'.
 Guillermo (voiced by Eric Bauza) – Guillermo is a kid who had an awesome new bike until the Perpetual Persistence crushed it. So in Uncle Grandpa and Belly Bag's absence Mr. Gus and Pizza Steve help Guillermo by giving him a trashcan and saying it was a "Magical Uncle Grandpa Bike". Guillermo appears in "Uncle Grandpa for a Day".
 Susie (voiced by Grey DeLisle-Griffin) – Susie is a little girl who was afraid of the dark, but learned how to combat her fears by imagining herself as a scary monster. She appears in "Afraid of the Dark".
 Adam (voiced by Dee Bradley Baker) – Adam is a kid who couldn't become the master of a very hard video game, until Uncle Grandpa and Pizza Steve shrink to get inside his brain to become better at video games. He would always have his eyes barely open showing that he's been playing videogames too much, and his eyes are sore from playing too much. Adam appears in "Brain Game".
 Angry Man Johnson (voiced by Roger Craig Smith) – Angry Man Johnson is a grumpy old man who hates Charlie Burgers. Judging by his name, he is always angry at everyone, including Uncle Grandpa. Angry Man Johnson appears in "Charlie Burgers".
 Austin (voiced by Carlos Alazraqui) – Austin is a kid who had a lot of imperfections so he asked Uncle Grandpa to turn him into a robot to become the most perfect kid, and to eliminate all imperfections. Austin appears in "Perfect Kid".
 Shaquille O'Neal (voiced by himself) – The former professional basketball player who is an old friend of Uncle Grandpa. In the past, Uncle Grandpa helped Shaq realize his dream of being a stand-up comedian. He appears in "Perfect Kid" after Uncle Grandpa is chased into a comedy club that Shaq was performing at, where he helps Uncle Grandpa fight against Austin 2.0 by combining with the audience in a manner similar to a giant robot. Uncle Grandpa finds the jokes Shaq makes to be very funny.
 Akira (voiced by Jessika Van) – Akira is a Japanese kid who wanted to make the best action packed monster movie of all time. Akira appears in "Big in Japan".
 Riley (voiced by Scott Menville) – Riley is a teenage boy who fails a test, his father grounds him and demands him to fold laundry all weekend instead of going to a party.
 Josie (voiced by Grey DeLisle-Griffin) – Josie is a girl who was trying to make duck lips for a site called "face hole" and tries to get a lot of followers and likes. Josie appears in "Duck Lips".
 Emily (voiced by Susanne Blakeslee) - Emily is a girl scout.
 Isabella (voiced by Nika Futterman) - Isabella is a girl who is an aspiring inventor but her inventions are useless. Isabella appears in "Inventor Mentor".

Pilot
 Ham Sandwich Jones (voiced by Steven Blum) – A rotund nerdy teenager who started out hating Uncle Grandpa, but later grew to like him. In the Secret Mountain Fort Awesome episode "5 Disgustoids and a Baby", he appeared as less responsive, and more stingy while intensely playing a portable gaming system. He can be seen in the show's intro and has a very brief role in "Big Trouble for Tiny Miracle".
 Little Judy Jones (voiced by Grey DeLisle-Griffin) – Ham Sandwich's fat mother.
 Remo (voiced by Tom Kenny) – A destructive popular kid, who similarly started off hating Uncle Grandpa, but ends up warming up to his antics. He appears in Secret Mountain Fort Awesome episode "Secret Mountain Uncle Grandpa".
 Remo's Friends (voiced by Steve Little and Tom Kenny) – The cool-dude friends of Remo.
 Kev (voiced by Jon Heder) – Kev is a destructive teenager who thought art was dumb until Uncle Grandpa convinced him that art is pretty fun. Kev appears in "Viewer Special". The character originally appeared in a live-action film starring Browngardt called The Last American.
 Crazy Driving Man (voiced by Paul Rugg, Wallace Shawn) – A man who wears framed glasses, who is the somewhat "uncool" father of his son Remo. He reappears as a driving instructor in Uncle Grandpas 7th episode, "Driver's Test", and claims to be the father of a crazy driving baby from another universe and voiced by Wallace Shawn.

Episodes

Specials

Christmas Special
The first-season episode "Christmas Special" was aired in December 2014. A double-length Christmas special, it centers on Uncle Grandpa who reluctantly agrees to disguise himself as his brother Santa Claus, after the latter character injures a leg. The episode received mostly praise in international publications, and in the United States it was viewed by 1.5 million. Cartoon Network developed a browser game adaptation named Sneakin' Santa to promote the episode. The episode was well received by the critics during its respective Christmas season.

Say Uncle

A crossover special between Uncle Grandpa and Steven Universe was aired as an episode of the latter series' second season in April 2015. Conceived of by the creator of the latter series, Rebecca Sugar, the episode has Uncle Grandpa teach Steven how to bear a shield from his gemstone. Nearly two million viewed the episode, which received acclaim from critics.

Guest Directed Shorts
The second-season episode "Guest Directed Shorts" was aired in June 2015 and consists of three animated shorts. The first short, directed by M. Wartella, has Uncle Grandpa using time travel in order to find the best hamburger; the second, by Pendleton Ward, has Pizza Steve beatboxing with Uncle Grandpa in the park; and the third, by Max Winston, has the RV gang getting trapped in Uncle Grandpa's claymation mind after their television set breaks down. Wartella is known for his work on the animated series Superjail! and Mad, while Ward is the creator of Adventure Time; Winston is a professional stop-motion artist. The episode was viewed by 1.3 million. The episode was very well received by the critics, while Winston's short was nominated for best television production at the 2015 edition of the Annecy Film Festival.

Uncle Grandpa Babies
Uncle Grandpa Babies first appeared as a short in the 2014 episode "Grounded" as a faux Cartoon Network ad that presents a series called "Uncle Grandpa Babies" and claims to be made by the same creators of Adventure Time (Pendleton Ward) and Steven Universe (Rebecca Sugar). One year later, a full episode based on the babies saving America from a foreign country's missile launch aired on August 20, 2015.

In light of the special premiering, reruns of Baby Looney Tunes returned to Cartoon Network.

Production
The Uncle Grandpa pilot was created by former Chowder storyboard artist Peter Browngardt, who first pitched the idea to Cartoon Network in 2006. Browngardt, who grew up the youngest in a large family of eight children (his eldest brother Tom would go on to work as the show's film editor), based the character upon the various and often eccentric relatives who would often drop by and visit them, as well as aspects of his own personality. The style of the show was inspired by his love of comics and Warner Bros. Cartoons. The pilot was produced in 2008, then aired online in 2009 on Cartoon Network Video as part of The Cartoonstitute. Akin to the Regular Show pilot, the Uncle Grandpa pilot was successful, but it too have been green-lit into its own series.

In 2011, the TV series Secret Mountain Fort Awesome (based on the creatures that appear in the original short) aired on Cartoon Network, but was not as well-received as the other Cartoon Network shows at the time, and was eventually put on hiatus in February 2012. Despite the failure, Secret Mountain Fort Awesome went on to win several awards, including the coveted Crystal Award for "Best Television Production" at Annecy International Animated Film Festival, the first United States-based production to do so. This helped boost Browngardt's profile in getting Uncle Grandpa greenlit as a series. Another factor that contributed to the launch of the show was the redesign of the character by John Kricfalusi, The Ren & Stimpy Shows creator.

On July 27 and 28, 2013, Cartoon Network aired a sneak peek of the series as part of Big Fan Weekend, along with Clarence and Steven Universe.

On August 17, 2022, it was announced that HBO Max would be removing several series, including Uncle Grandpa.

International broadcast
In India, it aired in 2015 on Cartoon Network India and it airs still now on Cartoon Network HD+.
In Canada, it premiered on September 2, 2013 on Cartoon Network. It also premiered on Cartoon Network channels in the United Kingdom and Ireland on April 14, 2014 and in Australia on May 5, 2014.
In the Middle East, it premiered on July 6, 2014 on Cartoon Network Arabic.

Home media

DVD releases
{|class="wikitable sortable" style="text-align:center"
|+ Region 1
|-
! style="width:18%;"|DVD title
! style="width: 6%;"|Season(s)
! style="width: 5%;"|Aspect ratio
! style="width: 6%;"|Episode count
! style="width:7%;"|Total running time
! style="width:10%;"|Release dates
|-
|Tiger Trails
|1
|16:9
|12
|132 minutes
|December 16, 2014
|-
|Good Mornin'''
|1
|16:9
|12
|132 minutes
|April 7, 2015
|}

Accolades

Comics
On April 30, 2014, Kaboom! announced that Uncle Grandpa comics were in the works. Issue 1 was released on October 15, 2014.

See also

 Secret Mountain Fort Awesome Grandpa Danger''

References

External links
 
 
 

 
2013 American television series debuts
2017 American television series endings
2010s American animated television series
2010s American surreal comedy television series
American animated television spin-offs
American children's animated comedy television series
American children's animated fantasy television series
American television series with live action and animation
Cartoon Network original programming
Television series by Cartoon Network Studios
Crossover animated television series
English-language television shows
Metafictional television series
Self-reflexive television
Television series created by Peter Browngardt
Animated television series about dinosaurs
Television series about tigers